Woodhill or Wood Hill may refer to:

People 
 Herbert Woodhilll (1875–1963), Australian rugby league footballer
 Constance Caroline Woodhill Naden (1858–1889), English poet and philosopher

Places

Australia 
 Woodhill, New South Wales
 Woodhill, Queensland, a locality in the City of Logan

New Zealand 
 Woodhill, Auckland
 Woodhill, Whangārei, Northland Region

United Kingdom 
 Woodhill, Angus, Scotland
 Woodhill (HM Prison), a maximum security prison in Milton Keynes, England
 Woodhill Road Halt railway station, a disused railway station in Bury, England

United States 
 Woodhill (RTA Rapid Transit station), a railway station in Cleveland, Ohio
 Wood Hill, Missouri
 Wood Hills, a mountain range in Elko County, Nevada